Mohan Choti (1935 – 1 February 1992) was an Indian actor who worked as a comedian in Hindi films. The name Mohan Choti came from a fictional character of the same name from the 1957 film Musafir, in which he plays a tea shop delivery boy who sports a "choti" or traditional lock of hair on the top of his head.

Biography 
Mohan Choti was born as Mohan Rakshakar to Constable Atmaram Rakshakar in 1933 at Amravati, Amravati District Maharashtra.

He produced and directed two films — "Dhoti Lota Aur Chowpatty" and "Hunterwali 77". He also opened a restaurant which was called "Sawal roti ka; Dhaba choti ka". He also started Atta distribution unit called "Choti Walla Atta".

He died on 1 February 1992 at the age of 57.

Filmography
Mohan Choti acted in nearly 280 films from 1954 to 1994.
 1994 Do Fantoosh
 1994 Mere Data Garib Nawaz
 1993 Badi Bahen
 1993 Kala Coat
 1993 Shuruaat 
 1992 Sarphira 
 1992 Naseebwaala
 1991 Ajooba as  Ladies  Tailor (Special Appearance)
 1990 Majboor
 1990 Shandaar   
 1990 Doodh Ka Karz
 1990 Muqaddar Ka Badshaah   
 1990 Thanedaar
 1990 Zahreelay
 1989 Vishwamitra as Nakshatrik (TV series)
 1989 Dana Paani   
 1989 Mahaadev
 1989 Touhean
 1989 Teri Payal Mere Geet   
 1989 Bade Ghar Ki Beti
 1989 Hum Intezaar Karenge
 1989 Naqab
 1989 Na-Insaafi
 1988 Aurat Teri Yehi Kahani
 1988 Falak (1988 film)
 1988 Maar Dhaad
 1988 Chintamani Surdas 
 1988 Qatil
 1988 Jungle Ki Beti
 1988 Paigham
 1988 Shiv Ganga 
 1988 Vikram Aur Betaal (TV Series)
 1987 Goraa 
 1987 Kalyug Aur Ramayan
 1987 Hamari Jung
 1987 Pyaar Karke Dekho
 1987 Dadagiri
 1987 Hamari Jung 
 1987 Khooni Darinda
 1986 Zinda Laash   
 1986: Naache Mayuri 
 1986 Chambal Ka Badshah   
 1986 Kala Dhanda Goray Log
 1986 Insaaf Ki Awaaz
 1986 Sadaa Suhagan
 1986 Jaal 
 1986 Begaana  
 1985 Sur Sangam
 1985 Hum Dono
 1985 Alag Alag
 1985 Ghar Dwaar
 1985 Ek Chitthi Pyar Bhari   
 1985 Pataal Bhairavi
 1985 Insaaf Main Karoonga
 1985 Piya Milan
 1984 Dharam Aur Kanoon
 1984 Zindagi Jeene Ke Liye  
 1984 Boxer   
 1984 Tohfa   
 1984 Hum Hain Lajawaab
 1984 Raja Aur Rana
 1984 Raaj Tilak
 1984 Aaj Ka M.L.A. Ram Avtar 
 1984 Phulwari (1984 film)
 1984 Naya Kadam
 1984 Abodh
 1984 Yaadgaar 
 1984 Maang Bharo Sajana
 1983 Daulat Ke Dushman
 1983 Mehndi
 1983 Bekaraar 
 1983 Jai Baba Amarnath 
 1983 Humse Na Jeeta Koi
 1983 Sant Ravidas Ki Amar Kahani 
 1983 Jaani Dost    
 1983 Film Hi Film 
 1983 Jaanwar
 1983 Humse Naa Jeeta Koi
 1982 Chorni 
 1982 Teri Maang Sitaron Se Bhar Doon
 1982 Ashanti
 1982 Apna Bana Lo 
 1982 Aadat Se Majboor
 1982 Sumbandh
 1981 Jwala Daku
 1981 Hum Se Badkar Kaun
 1981 Guru Suleman Chela Pahelwan 
 1981 Naseeb
 1981 Bandish
 1981 Commander
 1981 Farz Aur Pyar 
 1981 Be-Shaque
 1981 Nai Imarat 
 1981 Maan Gaye Ustaad
 1981 Jai Baba Amarnath
 1980 Phir Wohi Raat 
 1980 Nishana
 1980 Chunaoti
 1980 Saboot 
 1980 Banmanush
 1979 Maan Apmaan
 1979 Khandaan
 1979 Har Har Gange
 1979 Hamare Tumhare
 1979 Janta Hawaldar 
 1979 Bombay by Nite
 1979 Shaitan Mujrim 
 1979 Bhakti Mein Shakti  
 1979 Sultan E Hind: Gharib Nawaz 
 1979 Teen Chehrey 
 1978 Khoon Ka Badla Khoon 
 1978 Azaad (1978 film)
 1978 Apna Khoon 
 1978 Parmatma
 1978 Chakravyuha 
 1978 Dhyanu Bhagat
 1978 Phaansi
 1978 Toofani Takkar 
 1977 Dream Girl
 1977 Angaare
 1977 Do Dilwale
 1977 Hunterwali
 1976 Khalifa 
 1976 Bairaag 
 1976 Shankar Dada
 1976 Play-Boy 
 1976 Noor-E-Irani
 1976 Sikka
 1976 Bhagwan Samaye Sansar Mein
 1976 Noor E Ilaahi 
 1975 Ek Gaon ki Kahani
 1975 Biwi Kiraya Ki 
 1975 Varaat 
 1975 Balak Aur Janwar 
 1975 Apne Dushman
 1975 Jaggu
 1975 Raftaar
 1975 Aakhri Dao
 1975 Qaid
 1975 Aag Aur Toofan 
 1975 Dhoti Lota Aur Chowpatty
 1975 Dharmatma
 1975 Dafaa 302
 1975 Daku Aur Bhagwan
 1975 Shree Satyanarayan Ki Maha Pooja
 1975 Toofan Aur Bijlee  
 1974 Kasauti
 1974 Jai Radhe Krishna
 1974 Amir Garib
 1974 Doosri Sita
 1974 Ganga
 1973 Yauwan
 1973 Jaise Ko Taisa
 1973 Gaai Aur Gori 
 1973 Dharma
 1973 Intezaar
 1973 Taxi Driver
 1973 Alam Ara
 1973 Jhoom Utha Akash
 1973 Naag Mere Saathi
 1972 Victoria No. 203
 1972 Tangewala
 1972 Shehzada
 1972 Anokhi Pehchan
 1972 Achha Bura
 1972 Raaste Kaa Patthar
 1972 Double Cross 
 1972 Parchhaiyan
 1972 Do Chor
 1972 Bees Saal Pehle
 1972 Ek Khiladi Bawan Pattey
 1972 Amar Prem
 1971 Mera Gaon Mera Desh 
 1971 Aisa Bhi Hota Hai 
 1971 Amar Prem 
 1971 Albela 
 1971 Haseenon Ka Devata 
 1971 Pyar Ki Kahani
 1971 Ek Nari Ek Brahmachari
 1971 Lakhon Me Ek
 1971 Preet Ki Dori 
 1971 Sansar
 1971 Ek Din Aadhi Raat
 1971 Maata Vaishno Devi
 1970 Yaadgaar
 1970 Bhai-Bhai 
 1970 Kab? Kyoon? Aur Kahan?
 1970 Sharafat
 1970 Gunah Aur Kanoon 
 1970 Pagla Kahin Ka
 1970 Truck Driver
 1970 Tum Haseen Main Jawan
 1970 Raate Ke Andhere Mein
 1969 Anjaana
 1969 Ek Shriman Ek Shrimati
 1969 Patthar Ke Khwab 
 1969 Do Raaste
 1969 Anjan Hai Koyee
 1969 Chanda Aur Bijli
 1969 Tumse Achha Kaun Hai
 1969 Jiyo Aur Jeene Do
 1969 Sapna
 1968 Kahin Din Kahin Raat 
 1968 Raja Aur Runk
 1968 Abhilasha
 1968 Aadmi
 1968 Brahmachari
 1968 Jung Aur Aman
 1968 Aanchal Ke Phool
 1968 Lutera Aur Jadugar
 1967 Upkar as Mangal
 1967 Aurat 
 1967 Farz
 1967 Aag 
 1967 Raat Andheri Thi
 1966 Love in Tokyo
 1966 Sawan Ki Ghata
 1966 Aakhri Khat
 1966 Do Badan
 1966 Daadi Maa
 1966 Dada
 1966 Lal Bangla
 1966 Shankar Khan
 1965 Bhoot Bungla 
 1965 Khandaan
 1965 Shreeman Funtoosh
 1965 Rustom-E-Hind
 1965 Ek Saal Pehle 
 1965 Bekhabar
 1965 Jahan Sati Wahan Bhagwan
 1965 Gopal - Krishna
 1964 Mr. X in Bombay
 1964 Mera Qasoor Kya Hai 
 1964 Ziddi
 1964 Woh Kaun Thi?
 1964 Sati Savitri 
 1964 Samson 
 1964 Pooja Ke Phool
 1964 Mama Ji (1964) Punjabi Movie 
 1964 Daal Me Kala-Hajjam
 1964 Darasingh: Ironman
 1964 Ek Din Ka Badshah
 1964 Shabnam
 1964 Tarzan Aur Jalpari
 1964 Maain Bhi Ladki Hun 
 1963 Bluff Master
 1963 Taj Mahal
 1963 Jab Se Tumhe Dekha Hai
 1963 Mujhe Jeene Do
 1963 Been Ka Jadoo
 1962 Man-Mauji
 1962 Main Chup Rahungi
 1962 Burmah Road 
 1962 Jhoola
 1962 Apna Banake Dekho
 1962 Shaadi 
 1962 Anpadh
 1962 Rakhi
 1962 Raaz Ki Baat
 1962 Private Secretary   
 1962 Dil Tera Diwana
 1962 Pyar Ki Jeet
 1961 Chhaya
 1961 Umar Qaid
 1961 Pyaar Ka Saagar
 1961 Boy Friend 
 1961 Guddi as Batura (1961) Punjabi Movie 
 1961 Pyaar Ki Dastaan
 1960 Ek Phool Char Kaante
 1960 Dil Bhi Tera Hum Bhi Tere
 1960 Patang
 1959 Barkha   
 1959 Kaagaz Ke Phool  
 1959 Duniya Na Mane
 1959 Nai Raahen   
 1959 Dhool Ka Phool
 1959 C.I.D. Girl
 1958 Chalti Ka Naam Gaadi
 1957 Hum Panchhi Ek Daal Ke
 1957 Ab Dilli Door Nahin
 1957 Musafir
 1957 Ek Gaon Ki Kahani
 1956 Parivar
 1955 Devdas
 1954 Jagriti

References

External links

1935 births
1992 deaths
Male actors in Hindi cinema
Place of birth missing
20th-century Indian male actors